Lipové, known from 1926 to 1950 as Hodžovo, is a village and municipality in the Komárno District in the Nitra Region of south-west Slovakia.

Geography
The village lies at an altitude of 110 metres and covers an area of 10.578 km².
It has a population of about 180 people.

History
In the 9th century, the territory of Lipové became part of the Kingdom of Hungary. In historical records the village was first mentioned in 1245.
After the Austro-Hungarian army disintegrated in November 1918, Czechoslovak troops occupied the area, later acknowledged internationally by the Treaty of Trianon. The village was created in 1926. Between 1938 and 1945 territory of Lipové once more became part of Miklós Horthy's Hungary through the First Vienna Award. From 1945 until the Velvet Divorce, it was part of Czechoslovakia. Since then it has been part of Slovakia.

Ethnicity
The village is about 84% Slovak and 16% Hungarian.

Facilities
The village has a public library and a football pitch.

References

External links
 

Villages and municipalities in the Komárno District